Return fraud is the act of  defrauding a retail store by means of the return process. There are various ways in which this crime is committed. For example, the offender may return stolen merchandise to secure cash, steal receipts or receipt tape to enable a falsified return, or use somebody else's receipt to try to return an item picked up from a store shelf. Return abuse is a form of "friendly fraud" where someone purchases products without intending to keep them. Perhaps the best-known form of this abuse is "wardrobing" or "free renting" – in which the person makes a purchase, use the product(s), and then returns the merchandise.

The retail industry experiences a significant fraud and abuse problem, losing money in the range of $24 billion per year, roughly 7% of all returns and exchanges.

Return fraud and theft have been reported to lead to price increases for shoppers. Some stores create strict return policies such as "no receipt, no return" or impose return time restrictions.

Types
Some examples of return fraud include:

 Bricking: Purchasing a working electronic item, deliberately damaging or stripping it of valuable components to render it unusable, then returning the item for profit.
 Cross-retailer return: Returning or exchanging an item purchased at another retailer (usually at a lower price) for cash, store credit, or a similar, higher-priced item at another retailer.
 Employee fraud: Assistance from employees to return stolen goods for full retail price.
 Open-box fraud: Purchasing an item from a store and returning it opened with the intent to re-purchase it at a lower price under the store's open-box policies. A variation of price-switching.
 Price arbitrage: Purchasing differently priced, but similar-looking merchandise and returning the cheaper item as the expensive one.
 Price switching: Placing higher-priced labels on merchandise with the intention of returning the item(s) at a higher price than purchase.
 Receipt fraud: Utilizing reused, stolen, or falsified receipts to return merchandise for profit. Alternatively, returning goods purchased on sale or from a different store at a lower price with the intention of profiting from the difference.

 Returning stolen merchandise: Shoplifting with the objective to return the item(s) for full price, plus any sales tax.
 Switch fraud: Purchasing a working item, and returning a damaged or defective identical item that was already owned.

Return policies have historically served as the primary way for retailers to combat return fraud and abuse; the challenge is keeping policies from being overly restrictive or inconsistently interpreted, both of which may discourage loyal customers and affect purchases. Automated solutions have also been developed to help combat return fraud and abuse, including software programs that detect such behavior and help retailers determine whether a return is valid.

Wardrobing
Wardrobing, purchasing merchandise for short-term use with the intent to return the item, has been described by industry advocates as a form of return fraud. Wardrobing is a form of return fraud where an item is purchased, used, and then returned to the store for a refund. It is most often done with expensive clothing - hence the name - but the practice is also common with tools, electronics, and even computers. To prevent this practice, some stores make certain items, such as wedding dresses or Christmas decorations, unreturnable. Some observers classify wardrobing as a form of shoplifting.

See also

Claude Allen, assistant to U.S. President George W. Bush who resigned after being arrested for return fraud

References

External links
 National Retail Federation
 Loss Prevention Research Council
 Dr. Mark Rosenbaum and Dr. Ronald Kuntze The relationship between anomie and unethical retail disposition

Retailing-related crime
Fraud